Boring is an unincorporated community in Sullivan County, Tennessee. Boring is located off Tennessee State Route 75 in Southern Sullivan County, southeast of Kingsport.

History
A post office called Boring was established in 1881, and remained in operation until it was discontinued in 1903. The community might be named for a member of the Boring family known to be residing there in the 1870s.

References

Geography of Sullivan County, Tennessee
Unincorporated communities in Tennessee
Unincorporated communities in Sullivan County, Tennessee